Stefano Moreo (born 30 June 1993), is an Italian professional footballer who plays as a striker for Serie B club Pisa.

Club career
On 15 June 2022, Brescia purchased his rights after the loan in the 2021–22 season.

On 20 January 2023, Moreo joined Pisa.

References

External links

1993 births
Footballers from Milan
Living people
Italian footballers
Association football forwards
Virtus Entella players
S.S. Teramo Calcio players
Venezia F.C. players
Palermo F.C. players
Empoli F.C. players
Brescia Calcio players
Pisa S.C. players
Serie B players
Serie C players
Serie D players
S.C. Caronnese S.S.D. players